The 1940 Western Reserve Red Cats football team represented the Western Reserve University, now known as Case Western Reserve University, during the 1940 college football season. The team was led by sixth-year head coach Bill Edwards, who was assisted by Gene Myslenski and Roy A. "Dugan" Miller. Notable players included Johnny Reis, Andy Logan, Stan Skoczen
, Steve Belichick, Dom "Mickey" Sanzotta and Dick Booth.

The season opener against the Akron officially opened their new Rubber Bowl. Western Reserve conclude the season with a win in the Sun Bowl over Arizona State.

Schedule

References

Western Reserve
Case Western Reserve Spartans football seasons
Sun Bowl champion seasons
Western Reserve Red Cats football